Clostridium kluyveri (CLOKL) is an anaerobic, motile, gram-positive bacterium. It is named after the Dutch microbiologist Albert Kluyver.

References

External links
 Type strain of Clostridium kluyveri at BacDive -  the Bacterial Diversity Metadatabase

Gram-positive bacteria
Bacteria described in 1942
kluiveri